Susie Castillo (born October 27, 1979) is an American actress, TV host, model and beauty pageant titleholder who held the Miss USA title and competed in the Miss Teen USA and Miss Universe pageants. She pursued a career in the media, making various television appearances and hosting shows such as MTV's Total Request Live as a VJ.

Early years
Castillo was born in Methuen, Massachusetts, to a Dominican father and a Puerto Rican mother who were divorced when she was a child. After her father abandoned the family, her mother moved to Lawrence, Massachusetts, worked several jobs in order to defray living and educational expenses for her family. She was greatly influenced by her Puerto Rican heritage, though she has stated she considers herself both Puerto Rican and Dominican.

By 1996, at the age of 16, Castillo had already become a professional model appearing in many teen magazines and commercials. Upon graduating from Methuen High School, she enrolled at Endicott College, and in 2001 earned a bachelor's degree in Interior Architecture and Design. She received the Capstone Award in recognition of her senior thesis. She is a member of Kappa Delta sorority.

Beauty pageants

Miss Massachusetts Teen USA
Castillo won her first pageant title in November 1997, when she beat over forty other contestants to become Miss Massachusetts Teen USA 1998. Castillo's sister titleholder, Miss Massachusetts USA 1998 Shawnae Jebbia went on to win the Miss USA title in February the following year.

Castillo represented her state in the Miss Teen USA pageant held in Shreveport, Louisiana on August 17, 1998. Although the pageant was usually broadcast live, that year's telecast was delayed due to a speech by then-President Bill Clinton regarding his relationship with Monica Lewinsky. She also won the Clairol Herbal Essence Award that year. The pageant was won by Vanessa Minnillo of South Carolina.

Miss Massachusetts USA and Miss USA

In November 2002, Castillo participated in the Miss Massachusetts USA Pageant held at Bridgewater State College in the town of Bridgewater, and won the title. Castillo was the state's first Latina titleholder. She went on to compete in the Miss USA 2003 pageant held in San Antonio on March 24, 2003. Castillo won the Miss USA title in the nationally televised event, becoming Massachusetts' second titleholder, and the fourth former Miss Teen USA state titleholder to win the pageant. She was the third Hispanic to win Miss USA after Laura Harring in 1985 and Lynnette Cole in 2000. In addition she was the first woman with Dominican ancestry to win the title as well as the second woman with Puerto Rican ancestry to win after Lynnette Cole.

As Miss USA, Castillo represented the Miss Universe Organization, making appearances for charities throughout the United States. Her "sister" 2003 titleholders were Amelia Vega (Miss Universe, of the Dominican Republic) and Tami Farrell (Miss Teen USA, of Oregon).

Miss Universe
Castillo traveled to Panama City, Panama, to compete in the Miss Universe 2003 pageant in May. Her national costume was "Wonder Woman". Castillo placed among the 15 semifinalists. She placed 13th overall, like her placement at Miss Teen USA. The pageant was won by Amelia Vega of the Dominican Republic. Contrary to popular belief, it was not the first time that two Dominican women or two Puerto Rican women participated in the pageant's history because the contestants that represented Italy (Denny Mendez) and the Dominican Republic in the 1997 edition were both of Dominican ancestry and the contestants that represented USA (Lynnette Cole) and Puerto Rico in the 2000 edition were both of Puerto Rican ancestry.

Media career

Castillo has made guest appearances on the following shows: On-Air with Ryan Seacrest (April 5, 2004), My Wife and Kids (October 5, 2004), where she was cast as "Sharon", "Half & Half" (October 18, 2004) cast as "Shaunie". In August 2005, Castillo co-hosted the Miss Teen USA 2005 pageant alongside Passions actor Galen Gering. The event was won by Allie LaForce of Ohio.

Castillo was formerly a regular MTV VJ and host of TRL, and helped with the launch of Mi TRL on MTV Tr3s in September 2006. She is now pursuing acting full-time. She also played the role of Mercedes Hernandez in the TBS show Tyler Perry's House of Payne in a select number of episodes in season 5.

She also signed on as the brand ambassador for Charlotte Russe (retailer) and Gossip Girl stylist, Eric Daman, who is going to help her design her own line influenced by her Latino heritage.

In 2007, Castillo became a spokeswoman for Neutrogena. Castillo's work for Neutrogena includes serving as the "virtual host" of the company's promotional web site, The Big Blush. In 2008, Castillo hosted the ABC Family reality television series, America's Prom Queen. With Michael Flatley, she is the co-host of the NBC dance-competition series Superstars of Dance in 2009.

Castillo co-hosted the 2008 Arthur Ashe Kids’ Day on August 23 at the USTA Billie Jean King National Tennis Canter in New York City. Nickelodeon's Quddus was Susie's co-host.

Castillo was a host of the school renovation reality series School Pride, which aired on NBC in 2010. She also appeared in the 2011 film A Holiday Engagement.

In 2013, Castillo began appearing as 'Becky', a hand model, in Palmolive's Soft Touch dish soap commercials.

Personal life
On October 7, 2006, Castillo married Matthew Leslie in a quiet ceremony in Ipswich, Massachusetts. The two met shortly after Castillo won Miss Massachusetts Teen USA, Leslie proposed to Castillo during an appearance on the talk show On-Air With Ryan Seacrest in April 2004, just prior to Castillo passing on her crown during the Miss USA 2004 pageant. During her spare time Castillo does volunteer work for HAWC (Help for Abused Women and Children), the Lawrence Girls Club and for the Latinas Against Sexual Assault.

On April 27, 2011, Castillo issued a statement attacking the U.S. Transportation Security Administration (TSA), alleging that she had been groped and touched inappropriately four times during the enhanced pat-down. She released a blog post and video describing the experience, and created an online petition demanding an end to the "enhanced" pat-downs.

Castillo is a vegan and posed nude for a PETA anti-fur campaign, stating that she had always loved animals. Castillo urges the beauty pageant industry to stop awarding fur coats as prizes while exposing animals to unnecessary torture "in the name of fashion".

See also

 List of Puerto Ricans
 List of people from the Dominican Republic

References

External links

 
 Spotlight on Susie Castillo, Miss USA 2003
 Young Money Magazine interviews Susie Castillo
 

1979 births
American actresses of Puerto Rican descent
American beauty pageant winners
American people of Dominican Republic descent
Endicott College alumni
Living people
1998 beauty pageant contestants
20th-century Miss Teen USA delegates
Miss Universe 2003 contestants
Miss USA 2003 delegates
Miss USA winners
Participants in American reality television series
People from Lawrence, Massachusetts
People from Methuen, Massachusetts
Puerto Rican female models
VJs (media personalities)